The tabò is the traditional hygiene tool primarily for cleansing, bathing,  and cleaning the floor of the bathroom in the Philippines, Indonesia, East Timor, Malaysia, and Brunei. Tabò is the Filipino name, while gayung and cebok (pronounced chabo') are the equivalent terms used in Indonesia, Brunei, Malaysia, and East Timor. The tabò could most commonly be found in the provinces though it is also widely used in the cities. The word may be related to the word cebok in neighboring Indonesia and Malaysia, which describes the process of cleansing oneself using a tabò (or cebok) in a mandi (another Bahasa phrase for the tabò is kamar mandi).

The tabò can sometimes be translated into English as a "dipper" or "pitcher", but according to Michael Tan, chancellor at the University of the Philippines-Diliman and a columnist at the Philippine Daily Inquirer, tabò is much more than a dipper. The plastic tabò is an almost indispensable fixture in the Filipino home. Filipinos living overseas will bring their own tabò or even ask their relatives to send one over if ever they forget. 

Tabò is also widely used anywhere in a household for purposes other than bathing, such as for measuring volume. 1 tabo is often equal to 1 liter, as usually the household tabò would be the used plastic container of 1 liter of motor oil.

A tabò has similarity in design and use to the hishaku (柄杓), a Japanese water dipper with a handle made of bamboo.

History 
The tabo is the Filipino version of the dipper that is also well known in other Southeast Asian countries that use their own version of a dipper. The "modern" tabo was created during the introduction of plastic, using modern material to create the dipper instead of traditional coconut and bamboo materials. In the past, the tabo was called a sartin, from the Spanish sartén; back then sources of water were sometimes few and far between, which caused the ancestors of today's Filipinos to develop the tool or device. Instead of standing up each time to be able to reach the water source and wash their hands, the sartin was passed around to save time and, essentially, water, according to historian Lito Nunag of the University of the Philippines-Diliman.

Early use 
The early tabò dating back to the pre-colonial period used to be made out of coconut shell and bamboo, and it was not used as a toilet implement.

The tabò and its equivalent in many traditional homes in Southeast Asia is not so much a toilet item as an all-purpose household object. It is found at the entrance of the house, next to a terracotta water jar, a palayók, so guests can wash their hands and feet before entering the house. There, the tabo speaks of courtesies, the host's as well as the guest's. In the traditional kitchen, the tabo is again found with the palayók, which keeps and cools drinking water. The tabò is strategically located there for the purposes of taking out water to drink and of washing of hands and/or dishes. The tabò reflects an obsession with cleanliness, one which seems to have declined over time as the palayók and the tabò disappeared, or, in the case of the tabò, was relegated to the toilet and limited to its present, less sanitary function.

Usage 
The plastic tabo is kept mainly in the bathroom and is used as a water dipper for various functions. The emphasis is on properly utilizing the tabo or else a mess will be made in the toilet.
Its primary purpose is to clean. It is used to clean the toilet floor, to get water to flush the toilet, and most importantly, to get water for personal cleanliness: for washing the anus after using the toilet, for washing hands, for shampooing, or for bathing the whole body.

Filipinos use the tabo in addition to or instead of toilet paper to wash after using the bathroom. Not all toilets in the Philippines have an automatic flush, so instead, a timbâ (generally a plastic pail with a metal handle) and a tabò kept floating inside it is used. Upon entering the toilet, the pail should be checked if it has enough water.
Filipinos thoroughly wash their hands after going to the toilet, using water and any available cleansing agent be it soap or a laundry detergent bar.

Culture

Language 
Michael Tan mentioned that in the 17th century, the Jesuit Ignacio Alcina noticed how different words were used in the Visayan languages to refer to washing the feet, the hands, and the genitalia. One of Tan's readers wrote to confirm this, giving the many verbs for different types of washing, many of which probably involved the tabò.

Adaptation to the environment 
The tabo is crafted out of two of the more ubiquitous items in the Philippine natural environment: coconut and bamboo.

The use of the tabo is ecological in the way it recycles coconut shells. More importantly with regards to the toilet, it allows an economical use of water, often a scarce resource in many of the homes of Filipino families. For this purpose, the traditional tabo loses in terms of effectivity in saving water to the modern plastic version. The traditional tabo was developed in a pre-toilet era. It takes less water than the plastic one, not enough for flushing the toilet. The plastic tabo takes just about the right amount of water, which can have enough force for flushing, but that also requires some degree of artistry in the way one douses the water.

Cultural issues 
Non-Filipinos (apart from non-Filipino Muslims who use  similar hygiene practices, or others from places in Asia and Africa where the use of water is normal) may find the practice strange.

A controversy sparked in January 2009 when a Filipino machine operator was reportedly sacked by an engineering firm in Australia allegedly for his toilet habits. A Townsville Bulletin report posted on news.com.au said that Amador Bernabe, 43 years old, who is a Filipino machine operator, was kicked out of his job by the Townsville Engineering Industries (TEI) for using water, instead of toilet paper, to clean himself during toilet visits. After an investigation was conducted, Bernabe got his job back in the firm.

See also
Istinja – a similar Muslim practice for hygiene
Lota (vessel) – an equivalent vessel used in the Indian subcontinent and Africa
Ladle (spoon)

References 
Notes

Bibliography
 
  
 
  
 
 
 
 

Bathrooms
Philippine culture
Spoons